Agiannis is a village of the municipality of Pydna-Kolindros. Before the 2011 local government reform it was part of the municipality of Methoni. The 2011 census recorded 42 inhabitants in the village. Agiannis is a part of the community of Methoni.

See also
 List of settlements in the Pieria regional unit

References

Populated places in Pieria (regional unit)